Friedrich Honigmann (2 March 1841 in Düren – 19 December 1913 in Aix-la-chapelle) was a German coal entrepreneur. He was founder of the mining company Sophia-Jacoba in Germany and co-founder of Oranje Nassau Mijnen in the Netherlands

References
 , 1987, Seventy-five Years of Geology and Mining in the Netherlands, Royal Geological and Mining Society of the Netherlands (K.N.G.M.G.), The Hague, Netherlands

1841 births
1913 deaths
Businesspeople from North Rhine-Westphalia
People from Düren
German mining businesspeople